Karen Ching-Yee Seto  is a geographer, urbanisation and land change scientist, and Frederick C. Hixon Professor of Geography and Urbanisation Science at Yale University. She is an expert on urbanisation and sustainability, and satellite remote sensing. She was the co-lead for the chapter on urban mitigation in Intergovernmental Panel on Climate Change (IPCC) 6th Assessment Report and IPCC 5th Assessment Report. From 2014 to 2020, she was the co-editor-in-chief of the scientific journal Global Environmental Change. She is an elected member of the U.S. National Academy of Sciences (NAS), the Connecticut Academy of Science and Engineering (CASE), and the American Academy of Arts and Sciences, and an elected fellow of the American Association for the Advancement of Science (AAAS).

Early life and education 
Seto was born in Hong Kong and immigrated to the U.S. as a child. She attended Pomona Catholic High School and the University of California, Santa Barbara (UCSB), where she earned her bachelor's degree in political science. She went to Boston University for a joint master's degree in international relations, and resource and environmental management, followed by a doctorate in geography, where she worked with Robert C. Kaufmann and Curtis E. Woodcock. Her dissertation research studied urban land expansion and impacts on farmland in the Pearl River Delta of China. She was a pioneer in combining socioeconomic data and satellite imagery to study urban growth using time series analysis. She found that in the years between 1988 and 1996, urbanisation increased by over 300%, with the majority being converted from agricultural land.

Career and research 
Seto was awarded a NASA New Investigator Program in Earth Science Award in 2000 and an National Science Foundation CAREER Award in 2004. She was appointed a faculty member at Stanford University in 2000, where she held joint appointments at the Institute for International Studies and the Woods Institute for the Environment. Seto conducts research on the human transformation of land, understanding the processes of urbanisation and exploring the environmental impact of changes in land-use. Her early work considered the relationship between economic development, urbanisation and land use in China and Vietnam. She uses satellite remote sensing and field interviews as a means to document land use and spatial structure. She led the Ecosystem Management Tools for the Commission on Ecosystem Management of the International Union for Conservation of Nature (IUCN) from 2002 to 2008 and co-chaired the International Project on Urbanisation and Global Environmental Change from 2005 to 2016. In 2008, Seto joined the faculty of the Yale School of Forestry and Environmental Studies.

Seto was appointed Associate Dean for Research and Director of Doctoral Studies at the Yale School of Forestry & Environmental Studies in 2014 and the Frederick C. Hixon Professor of Geography and Urbanisation Science in 2017. She has been a coordinating lead author for two UN climate reports. She co-led the urban mitigation chapter of the 2022  Intergovernmental Panel on Climate Change (IPCC) 6th Assessment Report (AR6) and the 2014 IPCC 5th Assessment Report (AR5), which explored options to mitigate for greenhouse gases in urban areas. After an earthquake devastated areas in Nepal in 2015, Seto was inspired to investigate how the evolving urban developments were affecting vulnerability to hazards in the region. She led a NASA project that looks at the links between urban growth, vulnerability and natural disasters. She has studied the "hidden linkages" between urbanisation and food systems. Seto identified that the growth of urban areas worldwide could eliminate significant areas of agricultural lands, predicting that by 2030 an area the size of New Jersey could be lost. Seto has used satellite imagery and census data to explore urbanisation in India. She has used a range of satellite imagery to study urbanisation, including from the Defense Meteorological Satellite Program (DMSP) Operational Linescan System (OLS) nighttime lights imagery, Visible Infrared Imaging Radiometer Suite (VIIRS) and Landsat.

Seto edited a collection of papers for Proceedings of the National Academy of Sciences of the United States of America (PNAS) on urbanisation and sustainability, investigating the impact of large-scale urbanisation. In the special edition of PNAS, Seto identified three themes; the sustainability of urbanisation is multi-dimensional, and solutions that are designed for one dimension (public health, biodiversity) may not have a positive impact, urbanisation may be difficult to observe and that there is a pressing need to develop quantitative methods to evaluate social and ecological processes. Seto has called for an integrated approach for global sustainability as opposed to isolated activities. For example, she demonstrated that proper urban planning and effective transport policy could reduce energy use by 25% in cities around the world. This could include more "compact" development and increased energy efficient technology. She found that cities in the developing world resulted in 86% of the energy reduction, because they have potential to design strategies to promote short commutes. Together with Yale colleague Eli Fenichel, Seto was awarded a Resources for the Future Award in 2018 to estimate the value of satellite data products to measure and map urbanisation in the Himalaya.

She has held visiting professor positions at National Taipei University and the University of Copenhagen. She was the executive producer of the documentary film 10,000 Shovels: Rapid Urban Growth in China, which uses a variety of image sources to document rapid urban growth in China.

Books and films 
City Unseen: New Visions of an Urban Planet
Handbook on Urbanisation and Global Environmental Change
10,000 Shovels: Rapid Urban Growth in China (documentary film)

Awards and honours 
Awards and honours Seto has received include:

 2009 Aldo Leopold Leadership Fellow
 2014 Yale School of Forestry & Environmental Studies Faculty Award for Outstanding Teaching and Advising
 2017 Elected member of the U.S. National Academy of Sciences
 2017 American Association of Geographers Human Dimensions of Global Change Research Excellence Award
 2017 Fellow of the American Association for the Advancement of Science
 2017 Ecological Society of America Sustainability Science Award
 2018 Elected member of the Connecticut Academy of Science and Engineering
 2018 Clarivate Analytics Highly Cited Researchers List
 2019 American Association of Geographers Outstanding Contributions to Remote Sensing Research award
 2019 Clarivate Analytics Highly Cited Researchers List
 2020 Clarivate Analytics Highly Cited Researchers List
 2021 Clarivate Analytics Highly Cited Researchers List
 2022 Elected member of the American Academy of Arts and Sciences
 2022 American Geographical Society, Alexander and Ilse Melamid Medal

References 

Members of the United States National Academy of Sciences
Yale University faculty
University of California, Santa Barbara alumni
Boston University College of Arts and Sciences alumni
Stanford University faculty
Women geographers
American geographers
20th-century geographers
20th-century American scientists
20th-century American women scientists
21st-century geographers
21st-century American scientists
21st-century American women scientists
Year of birth missing (living people)
Living people
American women academics
Climate change mitigation researchers